The 2013–14 Liga de Nuevos Talentos season was split in two tournaments Apertura and Clausura. Liga de Nuevos Talentos was the fourth–tier football league of Mexico. The season was played between 9 August 2013 and 24 May 2014.

Torneo Apertura

Changes from the previous season 
Tecamachalco "B" was promoted from Tercera División, however, the team was moved to Oaxaca and was rebranded as Alebrijes de Oaxaca, becoming the reserve team of the Ascenso MX team.
Zacatepec was renamed as Selva Cañera, becoming the reserve team of the Ascenso MX team.
C.D. Oro was moved to Soledad de Graciano Sánchez, became the reserve team of Atlético San Luis. Unofficially, the team received the name of Santos de Soledad.
Tuzos UAZ was moved to Fresnillo and was rebranded as Mineros de Fresnillo F.C.
Excélsior F.C. was acquired by new owners, for that reason, the team was moved to San Juan de los Lagos and was rebranded as Deportivo San Juan.

Stadiums and Locations

Group 1

Group 2

Regular season

Group 1

Standings

Results

Group 2

Standings

Results

Regular Season statistics

Top goalscorers 
Players sorted first by goals scored, then by last name.

Source: Liga Premier

Liguilla

Liguilla de Ascenso (Promotion Playoffs) 
The four best teams of each group play two games against each other on a home-and-away basis. The higher seeded teams play on their home field during the second leg. The winner of each match up is determined by aggregate score. In the quarterfinals and semifinals, if the two teams are tied on aggregate the higher seeded team advances. In the final, if the two teams are tied after both legs, the match goes to extra time and, if necessary, a penalty shoot-out.

Quarter-finals

First leg

Second leg

Semi-finals

First leg

Second leg

Final

First leg

Second leg

Liguilla de Copa

Torneo Clausura

Regular season

Group 1

Standings

Results

Group 2

Standings

Results

Regular Season statistics

Top goalscorers 
Players sorted first by goals scored, then by last name.

Source: Liga Premier

Liguilla

Liguilla de Ascenso (Promotion Playoffs) 
The four best teams of each group play two games against each other on a home-and-away basis. The higher seeded teams play on their home field during the second leg. The winner of each match up is determined by aggregate score. In the quarterfinals and semifinals, if the two teams are tied on aggregate the higher seeded team advances. In the final, if the two teams are tied after both legs, the match goes to extra time and, if necessary, a penalty shoot-out.

Quarter-finals

First leg

Second leg

Semi-finals

First leg

Second leg

Final

First leg

Second leg

Liguilla de Copa

Relegation Table 

Last updated: 19 April 2014 Source: Liga Premier FMFP = Position; G = Games played; Pts = Points; Pts/G = Ratio of points to games played

Promotion Final
The Promotion Final is a series of matches played by the champions of the tournaments Apertura and Clausura, the game was played to determine the winning team of the promotion to Liga Premier de Ascenso. 
The first leg was played on 21 May 2014, and the second leg was played on 24 May 2014.

First leg

Second leg

See also 
2013–14 Liga MX season
2013–14 Ascenso MX season
2013–14 Liga Premier de Ascenso season

References

External links 
 Official website of Liga Premier
 Magazine page 

 
1